Crying In the Chapel is a studio album by the progressive bluegrass band Country Gentlemen.

Track listing 
 Crying in the Chapel (Glenn) 2:54
 I Feel Like Traveling On (Bland, Hunter, Vaughn) 2.23
 Heaven Got an Angel (Andes) 3:36
 Don't You Know That I'm Happy (MacMillion) 2:35
 Nobody's Child (Coben, Foree) 3:10
 I'll Never Die Just Be Promoted (Ellison, Groves) 2:14
 She Wore Pretty Dresses (Goodman) 3:10
 Jericho Road (Bowser) 2:52
 The Coal Mines Is a Good Place to Pray (MacMillion) 2:33
 City of God (Bruce) 2:36
 Keep Following Moses (Bowser) 3:15
 Two Men a Walkin' (Guillot) 2:22

Personnel 
 Charlie Waller - guitar, vocals
 Dan Aldridge - mandolin, guitar, vocals
 Greg Corbett - banjo, vocals
 Ronnie Davis - bass, vocals

with
 Gene Libbea -bass
 Greg Luck - violin, bass, guitar
 Rickie Simpkins - mandolin
 Kenny Smith - guitar
 Jaret Carter - Dobro
 Sammy Shelor - banjo, guitar
 Clay Jones - guitar

References 

2001 albums
The Country Gentlemen albums